Iceberg is an Italian luxury fashion design house. Founded in 1974 by Silvano Gerani and Giuliana Marchini, the house produces women's and men's' 'prêt-a-porter', accessories, fragrances and childrenswear. It is part of the Gilmar Group, founded in 1962. 
Its headquarters are in San Giovanni in Marignano, Emilia-Romagna, Italy. The founders' son Paolo Gerani is the creative person and the manager.

Starting as knitwear specialists, Iceberg were an early proponent of the concept of fashionable sportswear, later expanding into leatherwear and jeans. Their products have been worn by Pamela Anderson, Paris Hilton, Lil' Flip, Lil Bill, Lil' Kim and Mischa Barton. Lil' Flip references Iceberg clothing in many of his songs. In July 2011 the company collection was presented at the catwalk of The Brandery fashion show in Barcelona.

References

External links
 Iceberg website

Clothing brands of Italy
Companies based in the Province of Rimini
High fashion brands
Italian suit makers
Clothing companies established in 1974
Italian companies established in 1974
Fashion accessory brands
Swimwear manufacturers
Shoe companies of Italy
Eyewear brands of Italy
Perfume houses